Copadichromis trewavasae is a species of haplochromine cichlid which is endemic to Lake Malawi. It is widespread in the Lake, and so occurs in Malawi, Mozambique, and Tanzania. It is often found in areas rich in sediment where muddy deposits cover the underlying substrate, It feeds by picking out particles from the water column. This species of Copadichromis is named after noted ichthyologist Ethelwynn Trewavas.

References

trewavasae
Taxa named by Ad Konings
Fish described in 1999
Fish of Lake Malawi
Taxonomy articles created by Polbot